Éanna Basketball Club is an Irish basketball club based in Dublin. The club's senior men's representative team, DBS Éanna, is currently a member of Ireland's top national league, the Super League. The club has an academy for ages 5–9 years and teams from U10–U20 plus teams in the Dublin Men's Basketball League.

History
Éanna Basketball was set up by ex Coláiste Éanna players in the division two Dublin Men's Basketball League in 2005. In 2009, Éanna amalgamated with the highly successful underage club Notre Dame, adding a junior programme which grew the club to 13 teams including the senior teams. The 2014–15 season saw the club enter a Senior Men's team into the National League for the first time; the team placed third in its first season. In 2015, the team was elevated into the Premier League. In 2018, the team was demoted to Division One. After winning the National League Division One in 2018–19, the team was promoted back into the Super League. In January 2020, the Super League team made it to the National Cup final, where they lost 78–68 to Templeogue. The team would finish third in the Super League in the 2019–20 season. In January 2023, the Super League team made it to the National Cup final, where they lost 74–69 to Maree.

References

External links
Official website

Super League (Ireland) teams
Basketball teams in County Dublin